Françoise Lasserre (born 7 April 1955) is a French conductor, artistic director of the Akadêmia ensemble since 1986.

Life 

After graduating in mathematics, Lasserre completed her flute training, studying piano, choral singing, harmony, writing and conducting at the École Normale de Musique de Paris in Pierre Dervaux's class. At the beginning of the 1980s, she worked under the direction of Philippe Herreweghe within La Chapelle Royale and the Collegium Vocale Gent, then, as a chorister with Michel Corboz.

First "Ensemble vocal régional de Champagne-Ardenne", in residence in Reims, the ensemble's project was born thanks to the support of the Regional Council and Bernard Stasi, became professional ten years later changing its name to Akadêmia with the instrumentalists and in reference to the Platonic Academy and the Italian Accademia of the Renaissance. The ensemble is rewarded with the 1st prize of the  Palestrina competition in 1994. She is invited to conduct other ensembles, including the Maurice Emmanuel vocal ensemble, the Festival de musique de La Chaise-Dieu choir and the Vauluisant vocal ensemble. She taught choral conducting for two years at the Conservatoire à rayonnement régional de Poitiers.

In 2012, she prepared an opera, Orfeo, par-delà le Gange in India with an Odissi dancer, Hindu musicians, and young Indian singers. The work was premiered in Delhi and Paris in 2013 and on tour until 2016.

In 2014, she toured the United States, Russia and the United Kingdom.

In August 2018 she was the initiator of a singing competition, Voices of India.

Discography 
 Discography on Discogs
 See Akadêmia

References

Bibliography 
 
 Dix questions à Françoise Lasserre La vie en Champagne

External links 
 
 Notice on bach-cantatas.com
 Les 30 ans de l'ensemble Akadêmia - Françoise Lasserre, Baroquissimo ! by Benjamin François, podcast (5 August 2017, 120 min.) on France Musique
 Ensemble Akadêmia, Françoise Lasserre - Matthäus-Passion, BWV 244: No. 5, Recitative "Du, lieber Hei" (YouTube)

1955 births
Living people
French choral conductors
Women conductors (music)
École Normale de Musique de Paris alumni
20th-century French women musicians
21st-century French conductors (music)
21st-century French women musicians